Mpaka Airport  is an airport serving the village of Mpaka in Sud-Ubangi Province, Democratic Republic of the Congo.

See also

Transport in the Democratic Republic of the Congo
List of airports in the Democratic Republic of the Congo

References

External links
 OpenStreetMap - Mpaka
 Mpaka Airport
 HERE Maps - Mpaka
 OurAirports - Mpaka
 

Airports in Sud-Ubangi